Davgata is a village in the island of Cephalonia, Greece. It is part of the municipal unit of Argostoli. It is situated on a mountain slope above the eastern shore of the Gulf of Argostoli, at about 300 m elevation. Davgata is 2 km southeast of Farsa, 2 km west of Dilinata and 5 km north of Argostoli. Davgata has a Museum of Natural History, opened in 1996. The mountaintop of Evmorfia, elevation 1,043 m, lies to the northeast. Davgata was severely damaged by the 1953 Ionian earthquake.  Davgata has a natural history museum which is currently closed.

Historical population

References

External links
Natural History Museum of Davgata
GTP Travel Pages

Populated places in Cephalonia